The Mooloolah River is a river in South East Queensland, Australia. The river rises from the eastern slopes of the Blackall Range and flows east-northeast, similar to the Maroochy River to the north. The mouth of the river is at southern Mooloolaba. The catchment area covers 221 km2.

Addlington Creek, a tributary of the Mooloolah River was dammed by the Ewen Maddock Dam in 1973. Mountain Creek is another tributary that rises on the Buderim mountain that divides the Mooloolah and Maroochy watersheds.

The gastric-brooding frog is a recently extinct frog that was discovered in only three catchments, the Mary River, Mooloolah River and Stanley Rivers.

Although the Mooloolah River doesn't experience major flooding often, a flood warning system was established in 2004 to inform the Sunshine Coast Regional Council with river height predictions from network of rainfall and river height field stations.

History
The indigenous peoples of the area along the banks of the Mooloolah River were the Gubbi Gubbi peoples. Captain James Cook, on board the HM Bark Endeavour, sighted the Mooloolah River during his northward voyage along the Queensland coast in 1770.

In 1960, the Mooloolah River was adjoined to the Mooloolah River National Park to protect valuable remnants of coastal habitats.

See also

List of rivers of Australia
Mooloolah River National Park

References

Rivers of Queensland
Geography of Sunshine Coast, Queensland